"Place in This World" is a song by American musician Michael W. Smith, released in 1991 as the second single from his 1990 album Go West Young Man. The song became his biggest success in mainstream music when it hit No. 6 on the Billboard Hot 100. It lasted 21 weeks on the overall chart. The song is played in B major, mod. to C at 72 beats per minute. Background 
"Place in This World" was released in 1991, as the second single from his sixth studio album Go West Young Man. This record was his first attempt at mainstream success, which successfully crossed over the single. The message of the song has proved to be meaningful to a lot of people. Smith was asked if there are any stories that have stuck with him. He responded, "Well, the one story I remember vividly, I could still go back to reading the letter, was some young girl, I think she was 18 or 19 years old, and had a horrific childhood in terms of abuse and that sort of thing. And she was suicidal. She gave me this whole story in a two page letter. She was driving down the freeway and listening to a pop radio station and heard 'Place in This World' and pulled over and began to weep. And had this encounter with God on the side of the interstate. And her life forever changed. And that's the one that I'll never forget. There's been plenty of people talk about 'A Place in This World' but that's the one letter that I'll never forget."

The song won the GMA Dove Award for Song of the Year in 1992.

Personnel
 Michael W. Smith — lead vocals
 Mike Lawler — additional keyboards 
 Bryan Lenox — percussion, drums, keyboard programming
 Trace Scarborough — keyboard  programming
 Matt Pierson — synth bass 
 Dann Huff — guitar 
 Terry McMillan – percussion 
 Mark Douthit — saxophone 
 Barry Green — trombone 
 Mike Haynes — trumpet 
 Chris McDonald — horn arrangements 
 The Nashville String Machine — strings 
 Ronn Huff — string arrangements and conductor
 Carl Gorodetzsky — concertmaster and contractor

Charts

Weekly charts

Year-end charts

AccoladesGMA Dove Awards'''

References

External links
 

1990 songs
1991 singles
Michael W. Smith songs
Songs written by Michael W. Smith
Songs written by Amy Grant
Reunion Records singles